The People's Defense Force is the name of two fictional organizations appearing in American comic books published by Marvel Comics.

Fictional team history

Hungary version
The People's Defense Force is a team of Eastern European superbeings who are linked by the fact that they have individually fought Hank Pym during his earliest exploits as Ant-Man and Giant-Man. They operate as the People's Defense Force out of the Bratislava Prison Superhuman Research Complex in the latter days of European communism. With Quicksilver, who is being manipulated by Maximus the Mad, the People's Defense Force attack the West Coast Avengers to get at Pym. They are defeated by MODAM.

China version
Following the breakup of China Force, the Chinese government established its version of the People's Defense Force by bringing together China's most powerful metahumans. The People's Defense Force engaged Unspoken and are defeated where most of its members are killed in action. The surviving members encountered Quicksilver, Ban-Luck, and U.S. Agent who came to China to investigate an alliance between China and the Inhumans.

The People's Defense Force later appeared when they tried to apprehend the Royal Inhuman Diplomatic Mission when they come to China to investigate a Skyspear there.

Members

Hungary version members
Members of the People's Defense Force included:

 Beasts of Berlin -  The Beasts of Berlin are a group of western lowland gorillas mutated to human intelligence by Communist scientists and speech. They operate as a team. The Beasts first appear in Tales to Astonish #60 (Oct 1964).
 Madame X (Nina Vladimirovna Tsiolkovsky) - Madame X is a patriot and spy for the communist Hungarian government. She first appears in Tales to Astonish #32 (Oct 1962).
 Scarlet Beetles - The Scarlet Beetles are normal beetles that have been mutated to a size of 10-feet and given human intelligence and speech. The Scarlet Beetles first appear in Tales to Astonish #39 (Jan 1963).
 El Toro (Antonio Rojo) -  El Toro is Cuba's first super agent and an early opponent of Henry Pym. He first appears in Tales to Astonish #54 (Apr 1963)
 Voice (Jason Lorne Cragg) - The Voice is a man whose voice can make people who hear him believe that he's speaking the truth. Voice first appears in Tales to Astonish #42 (Apr 1963).

China version members
 Collective Man - Leader. He is actually identical quintuplets who can merge into one person that has the collective strength, speed, endurance, and agility.
 Lady of Ten Suns - A superhero with energy-based abilities, flight, forcefield projection, healing powers, heat generation, holographic projection, and light projection.
 Most Perfect Hero - A superhero with flight. He was killed in battle against Unspoken.
 Ninth Immortal - A superhero with immortality and invulnerability. He was killed in battle against Unspoken.
 Princess of Clouds - A superhero with flight and light projection. She was killed in battle against Unspoken.
 Radioactive Man - A former supervillain with radioactive abilities. He joined the group after Norman Osborn had him deported back to China.
 Scientific Beast - He wears an advanced suit of armor that enables him to fly and have other abilities that haven't been demonstrated.
 Spirit Animal - He can control and manipulate the animal life around him.

References

External links
 People's Defense Force (China) at Marvel.com
 People's Defense Force (Hungary) at Marvel Wiki
 People's Defense Force (China) at Marvel Wiki
 People's Defense Force (China) at Comic Vine

Characters created by Al Milgrom
Characters created by Steve Englehart
Comics characters introduced in 1988
Marvel Comics supervillain teams
Marvel Comics superhero teams
Characters created by Dan Slott